Nautilocalyx bicolor is a species of plant in the family Gesneriaceae. It is endemic to South America.

Synonyms
 Episcia bicolor Hook.
 Physodeira bicolor (Hook.) Hanst.

References
 Selbyana 5(1): 30 1978.
 The Plant List
 JSTOR
 GBIF

bicolor
Plants described in 1978